Zeugites is a genus of North American plants in the grass family. Its species are native to the Caribbean, Mexico, Central America, and/or South America.

Species
Species of Zeugites include:
 Zeugites americanus Willd. - from Mexico to Bolivia, and Greater Antilles in Caribbean
 Zeugites capillaris (Hitchc.) Swallen  -  Jalisco, Colima, México State, Guerrero, Oaxaca, Veracruz (México).
 Zeugites hackelii Swallen - Michoacán, Sinaloa, Jalisco, México State (México).
 Zeugites hintonii Hartley - México State
 Zeugites latifolius (E.Fourn.) Hemsl. - Jalisco, Guerrero, Oaxaca, and Chiapas (México), and Honduras
 Zeugites munroanus Hemsl. - Guatemala, El Salvador; and Chiapas, Veracruz (México).
 Zeugites panamensis Swallen - Costa Rica, Panama
 Zeugites pittieri Hack.  - from Chiapas (México) to Panama
 Zeugites sagittatus Hartley - México State
 Zeugites smilacifolius Scribn. - Michoacán, Morelos, México State, Guerrero, Jalisco (México).

Former species
Species formerly in Zeugites include:
 Zeugites sylvaticus - Calderonella sylvatica

References

External links
 Grassbase - The World Online Grass Flora

Poaceae genera
Grasses of North America
Grasses of Mexico
Grasses of South America
Flora of Central America
Flora of the Caribbean
Panicoideae